Mary Jacquiline Romero is a quantum physicist in the Australian Research Council Centre of Excellence for Engineered Quantum Systems at the University of Queensland, Australia. Her research expertise and interests are in the field of quantum foundations and quantum information. In particular, Romero is an experimental quantum physicist studying the properties of single photons for the development of new quantum alphabets and the nature of quantum causality.

Education 
Romero attended Philippine Science High School where she enjoyed physics the most out of her subjects. She completed a Bachelor of Science (Applied Physics) at the University of the Philippines in 2005. Following this she then completed her Masters in Physics in 2007 also at the University of the Philippines as a Philippine Council for Advanced Science and Technology Research and Development (PCASTRD) Scholar. Her Master's thesis was focussed on manipulating the shape of light for microscopy and microfabrication by using spatial light modulators (SLMs). Romero then left the Philippines and moved to the UK to do a PhD with Miles J. Padgett and Stephen Barnett at the University of Glasgow. Her PhD thesis explored the experimental and theoretical aspects of entanglement of spatial modes related to optical orbital angular momentum, extending the use of SLMs for the manipulation of single photons.

Career and research 
Following her PhD, Romero worked as a postdoctoral researcher at the University of Glasgow. During this time, Romero and her colleagues made headlines with their discovery of a way to slow down photons in free space. In 2015 she moved to Brisbane, Australia as a research fellow in the School of Mathematics and Physics at the University of Queensland. In 2016, Romero was awarded a Discovery Early Career Research Award (DECRA) to continue her work on quantum foundations and single photon manipulation, specifically studying security in higher-dimensional quantum systems. Romero's work on quantum alphabets seeks to increase the amount of information encoded in a single photon, as opposed to only two options (0 and 1) for encoding in classical computing. This research has implications for cyber security and more efficient data transfer and storage.  Romero is also currently developing a brain-inspired computer based on current quantum photonic capabilities to provide insight for both neuroscience and computing.

Honours 

 2019 Westpac Research Fellow 
2019 L’Oréal-UNESCO For Women in Science program International Rising Talent Prize
2018 Ruby Payne-Scott medal from the Australian Institute of Physics
2018 UQ Early Career Researcher Award for Photonic neuromorphic computing 
2018 Queensland Young Tall Poppy Award
 2018 Japan Society for the Promotion of Science HOPE Fellowship
2017 L’Oreal-UNESCO For Women In Science Fellowship
 2016 Discovery Early Career Research Award (DECRA)

Advocacy 
Romero has been an advocate for women in science, emphasising the importance of role models for young women interested in physics. In interviews, Romero emphasises that it is possible to have a productive research career and have children saying, “I do not feel less of a physicist because I am a mother, nor less of a mother because I am a physicist”

References 

Filipino women scientists
Filipino women academics
Alumni of the University of Glasgow
Quantum physicists
Year of birth missing (living people)
Living people
Women in optics